Pignon sur rue was a Quebec television programme from 1995 to 1999, on Télé-Québec.

Description
In modern terms, Pignon sur rue would be classified as reality television. This precursor of the genre is often cited by Québécois intellectuals as an early form of a more intelligent and respectable form of reality TV, before the Loft Story and Occupation Double era. Each season centered on a number of young women and men from diverse Quebec regions, living in one Montreal apartment (or several, depending on the season). It also featured Franco-Ontarians and one Acadian during its existence. The participants did not know each other before the adventure, except on season four. Its theme song was composed and performed by Gaspé chansonnier Kevin Parent.

See also
List of Quebec television series
Television of Quebec
Culture of Quebec
Reality television

External links

Television shows filmed in Quebec
Télé-Québec original programming
1990s Canadian reality television series
1995 Canadian television series debuts
1999 Canadian television series endings